Scopula hectata is a moth of the  family Geometridae. It is found in South Africa.

References

Endemic moths of South Africa
Moths described in 1858
hectata
Moths of Africa